Full Moon Fever is an album by Tom Petty.

Full Moon Fever may also refer to:

 Full Moon Fever (comics), a graphic novel by Joe Casey

 Full Moon Fever (novella), a Goosebumps book by R.L. Stine

See also
 Full Moon (disambiguation)